WJXP (90.1 FM) was a radio station licensed to serve Fitchburg, Massachusetts. The station was owned by Epic Light Network, Inc. It began broadcasting in 2011, and was owned by Horizon Christian Fellowship, airing a Christian format as an affiliate of RenewFM. On February 19, 2019, the station went silent. The station again went silent on February 24, 2020, for technical reasons. Effective November 24, 2020, the station was sold to Epic Light Network, Inc.

WJXP's license was cancelled on April 1, 2022, for failing to file a renewal application.

References

External links

JXP
Radio stations established in 2011
Radio stations disestablished in 2022
2011 establishments in Massachusetts
2022 disestablishments in Massachusetts
Fitchburg, Massachusetts
Mass media in Worcester County, Massachusetts
Defunct radio stations in the United States
Defunct religious radio stations in the United States
JXP